South Beach is a census-designated place (CDP) on North Hutchinson Island in Indian River County, Florida, United States. The population was 3,501 at the 2010 census. It is ranked tenth in Florida locations by per capita income as of 2010.

South Beach is part of the Sebastian–Vero Beach Metropolitan Statistical Area.

Geography
It is bounded on the east by the Atlantic Ocean, on the south by the border between Indian River and St Lucie counties, on the west by the Indian River Lagoon, and on the north by the Vero Beach city limits.

Demographics

As of the census of 2000, there were 3,457 people, 1,610 households, and 1,220 families residing in the CDP. The racial makeup of the CDP was 98.15% White, 0.58% African American, 0.09% Native American, 1.01% Asian, 0.06% from other races, and 0.12% from two or more races. Hispanic or Latino of any race were 1.36% of the population.

There were 1,610 households, out of which 15.1% had children under the age of 18 living with them, 72.7% were married couples living together, 2.4% had a female householder with no husband present, and 24.2% were non-families. 21.5% of all households were made up of individuals, and 15.9% had someone living alone who was 65 years of age or older.  The average household size was 2.14 and the average family size was 2.45.

In the CDP, the population was spread out, with 13.7% under the age of 18, 1.4% from 18 to 24, 11.3% from 25 to 44, 30.3% from 45 to 64, and 43.2% who were 65 years of age or older.  The median age was 61 years. For every 100 females, there were 93.2 males.  For every 100 females age 18 and over, there were 91.6 males.

The median income for a household in the CDP was $108,702, and the median income for a family was $126,755. Males had a median income of $89,395 versus $26,607 for females. The per capita income for the CDP was $90,938.  About 1.4% of families and 3.4% of the population were below the poverty line, including 8.0% of those under age 18 and 3.0% of those age 65 or over.

References

Census-designated places in Indian River County, Florida
Census-designated places in Florida
Populated coastal places in Florida on the Atlantic Ocean